A constitutional referendum was held in Sudan on 27 May 1998. A new Constitution of Sudan was approved by 97% of voters, with turnout reported to be 92%. It was signed into law on 30 June.

Results

References

Constitutional
Sudan
Referendums in Sudan
Constitutional referendums
Sudan